Genoa is an unincorporated community and census-designated place (CDP) in Miller County, Arkansas, United States. It was first listed as a CDP in the 2020 census with a population of 972. Although unincorporated, Genoa has a post office, with the ZIP code of 71840 for a specific post office box. Most of the community is served by ZIP code 71854 (Texarkana). Genoa also has its own school district, Genoa Central School District.

The community is part of the Texarkana, TX–Texarkana, AR Metropolitan Statistical Area.

Climate
The climate in this area is characterized by hot, humid summers and generally mild to cool winters.  According to the Köppen Climate Classification system, Genoa has a humid subtropical climate, abbreviated "Cfa" on climate maps.

Demographics

2020 census

Note: the US Census treats Hispanic/Latino as an ethnic category. This table excludes Latinos from the racial categories and assigns them to a separate category. Hispanics/Latinos can be of any race.

References

Unincorporated communities in Miller County, Arkansas
Unincorporated communities in Arkansas
Texarkana metropolitan area
Census-designated places in Arkansas
Census-designated places in Miller County, Arkansas